NGC 3921 is an interacting galaxy in the northern constellation of Ursa Major. Estimates using redshift put it at about 59 million light years (18 megaparsecs) from Earth. It was discovered on 14 April 1789 by William Herschel, and was described as "pretty faint, small, round" by John Louis Emil Dreyer, the compiler of the New General Catalogue.

NGC 3921 is the remnant of a galaxy merger. The two progenitor galaxies are thought to have been disk galaxies that collided about 700 million years ago. The image shows noticeable star formation and structures like loops, indicative of galaxies interacting. Because of this, NGC 3921 was included in Halton Arp's Atlas of Peculiar Galaxies under the designation Arp 224.

Being a starburst galaxy, NGC 3921 has important features. One of them is an ultraluminous X-ray source, designated X-2, with an X-ray luminosity of  erg/s. Additionally, two candidate globular clusters have been detected within NGC 3921. They are both fairly young, and about half as massive as Omega Centauri, demonstrating that mergers of gas-rich galaxies can also create more metal-rich globular clusters.

References

Notes

External links
 

224
3921
06823
037063
Starburst galaxies
Interacting galaxies
Ursa Major (constellation)